Victor Vladimirovich Antipin (born 6 December 1992) is a Russian professional ice hockey defenceman who is currently playing with Salavat Yulaev Ufa in the Kontinental Hockey League (KHL). He has previously played in the National Hockey League (NHL) with the Buffalo Sabres. He is the son of Vladimir Antipin.

Playing career
Antipin joined the youth team of Metallurg Magnitogorsk as a 16-year old in the 2008–09 season. He made his debut in the Kontinental Hockey League on the blueline with Magnitogorsk in the 2010–11 season,  appearing in 2 games.

After six seasons and two Gagarin Cups with Metallurg Magnitogorsk, following the 2016–17 season, Antipin terminated his contract with the club in order to pursue his NHL ambitions on 1 May 2017. He later signed a one-year, entry-level contract with the Buffalo Sabres on 25 May 2017. Antipin recorded his first NHL point on 24 October 2017 against the Detroit Red Wings. Antipin missed 13 games in January due to an illness. On 31 March 2018 Antipin was hit by Nashville Predators forward Scott Hartnell, suffering a concussion and broken nose from the hit. He was ruled out indefinitely for the rest of the season.

As a restricted free agent, Antipin was not qualified by the Sabres due to his falling on the depth chart. On 2 July 2018, Antipin opted to return to former club, Metallurg Magnitogorsk of the KHL, agreeing to an optional three-year contract.

After two seasons in his return to Magnitogorsk, Antipin left as a free agent and signed an improved two-year contract with SKA Saint Petersburg on 7 May 2020.

Following his first full season with SKA Saint Petersburg in 2020–21, Antipin was traded, alongside Miro Aaltonen, to HC Vityaz in exchange for four prospects on 15 June 2021. Antipin began the 2021–22 season with Vityaz, posting 3 assists through 28 games before he was again on the move after he was traded to Salavat Yulaev Ufa in exchange for Yevgeni Lisovets on 19 November 2021.

International play
Antipin played the 2009 World Junior A Challenge where he won the bronze medal with the Russian U18 team. He later played for Russian U18 national team in the 2010 IIHF World U18 Championships where the team finished in fourth place. Antipin played for the silver medal-winning Russian U20 national team in the 2012 World Junior Ice Hockey Championships, and later played for Russian men's national team in 2015, 2016 and 2017 world championships.

Career statistics

Regular season and playoffs

International

Awards and honors

References

External links
 

1992 births
Living people
Sportspeople from Oskemen
Russian ice hockey defencemen
Kazakhstani ice hockey defencemen
Kazakhstani people of Russian descent
Buffalo Sabres players
Metallurg Magnitogorsk players
Salavat Yulaev Ufa players
SKA Saint Petersburg players
Stalnye Lisy players
Undrafted National Hockey League players
HC Vityaz players
Russian expatriate sportspeople in the United States
Kazakhstani expatriate sportspeople in the United States
Kazakhstani expatriate ice hockey people
Russian expatriate ice hockey people
Expatriate ice hockey players in the United States